Zhumushan is a subdistrict of Hanshou County in Hunan, China. Dividing a part of the former Zhumushan Township and two villages of Taizimiao Town, the subdistrict was established in December 2015. The subdistrict has 16 communities and 6 villages under its jurisdiction, its seat is Xincheng Community.

External links
 Official Website (Chinese / 中文)

References

Hanshou
Subdistricts of Hunan